The 1995 Big League World Series took place from August 11–19 in Fort Lauderdale, Florida, United States. For the third consecutive year, Tainan, Taiwan defeated Broward County, Florida in the championship game. It was Taiwan's third straight title.

After reverting to the 11 team single bracket format in 1994; the two bracket system for US and International teams returned.

Teams

Results

United States Bracket

International Bracket

Elimination Round

Notes

References

Big League World Series
Big League World Series